Casey Bailey (born October 27, 1991) is an American professional ice hockey player. He is currently playing with the Iserlohn Roosters in the Deutsche Eishockey Liga (DEL). Bailey played college hockey with the Penn State Nittany Lions and is the first Penn State player to play in the NHL. Bailey played 13 games in the NHL for the Toronto Maple Leafs, whom he signed with out of college, and the Ottawa Senators.

Playing career
As a youth, Bailey played in the 2004 Quebec International Pee-Wee Hockey Tournament with a minor ice hockey team from Alaska. Bailey played junior A hockey for the Alberni Valley Bulldogs of the British Columbia Hockey League from 2009 to 2012 before going to play college hockey with the Penn State Nittany Lions. In the 2014–15 junior season, he finished fourth in scoring within the Big Ten Conference. He finished his Penn State career with 45 goals and 80 points in 96 games.

Having not been selected in any NHL Entry Drafts, Bailey signed a two-year, entry-level contract with the Toronto Maple Leafs on March 21, 2015. He became the first Penn State player to sign an NHL contract, as well as the first to play in the NHL. Fourteen other NHL teams had shown interest in Bailey and Bailey had previously attended training camps with the Boston Bruins and Calgary Flames. Prior to signing, Bailey was negotiating an entry-level deal with the Buffalo Sabres, however, the Sabres were unwilling to meet Bailey's demands of playing in the final few games of the team's season, prompting the signing with Toronto. 

Bailey played in his first NHL game on March 26, 2015 versus the Florida Panthers and was on the ice for the Maple Leafs lone goal in a 4–1 loss. Bailey scored his first NHL goal in the last game of his inaugural season, on April 11, 2015, against Carey Price of the Montreal Canadiens. During his first full professional season in 2015–16, Bailey was assigned to the Leafs' American Hockey League (AHL) affiliate, the Toronto Marlies, and produced 18 points in 38 contests before he was included alongside Dion Phaneuf in a nine-player trade to the Ottawa Senators organization on February 9, 2016. Bailey finished the season with the Senators' AHL affiliate Binghamton Senators collecting 7 goals and 21 points in 30 games.

On July 1, 2016, Bailey signed a one-year two-way contract with the Ottawa Senators. He was invited to training camp but Bailey was assigned to Binghamton to start the 2016–17 season. He was called up to Ottawa in December after Mike Hoffman was suspended and made his Ottawa debut on December 17 against the New Jersey Devils. He was sent back down but recalled again in January when Ottawa was dealing with a flu problem amongst the regulars. He finished the season with Binghamton, marking 21 goals and 37 points in 62 games and played in 7 games for Ottawa, going scoreless. He was Binghamton's only representative at the 2017 AHL All-Star Classic.

As a free agent from the Senators in the off-season, Bailey accepted an invitation to attend the New York Islanders 2017 training camp on September 12, 2017. Following the conclusion of the camp with the Islanders, Bailey was not offered a contract but was reassigned to try-out with their AHL affiliate, the Bridgeport Sound Tigers on September 24, 2017. After impressing in camp, Bailey was signed to a one-year AHL contract with the Sound Tigers on October 2, 2017. He finished the season with 18 goals and 41 points with Bridgeport.

Unable to attract significant high level North America interest, Bailey opted to take his career overseas, signing with HC Slovan Bratislava of the Kontinental Hockey League (KHL) on September 21, 2018. In Slovan's last year in the KHL in 2018–19 season, Bailey was used in a bottom six checking role, contributing with just 1 goal and 5 points through 45 games.

Returning to North America as a free agent, Bailey was signed to a professional try-out (PTO) agreement with the Hershey Bears of the AHL on July 30, 2019. After attending the Bears training camp, he was released from his tryout prior to the 2019–20 season. He then signed an East Coast Hockey League (ECHL) contract with the Hershey Bears's affiliate, the South Carolina Stingrays. Bailey added 11 points in just 9 games with the Stingrays before he was loaned to the Charlotte Checkers of the AHL on a PTO on November 12, 2019. Bailey contributed with 1 goal and 3 points in 5 games with the Checkers before he was released from his tryout on November 25, 2019. 

Having earlier secured a contract in Europe for the remainder of the 2019–20 season, Bailey was introduced on the same day on his release from the AHL by Swedish club, the Växjö Lakers of the Swedish Hockey League (SHL). Bailey made 28 appearances with Växjö, contributing offensively with 7 goals and 11 points, before the playoffs were abandoned due to the COVID-19 pandemic.

On September 4, 2020, as a free agent from Växjö, Bailey remained in Europe signing a one-year contract for the 2020–21 season with German club, Iserlohn Roosters of the Deutsche Eishockey Liga (DEL).

Personal life
Bailey was born in Anchorage, Alaska, to parents Glen and Dawn Bailey. He has one brother (Kyle Bailey) and a sister (Jessica Graham). Bailey is working on earning a university degree in economics.

Career statistics

Awards and honors

References

External links

1991 births
Living people
Alberni Valley Bulldogs players
American men's ice hockey forwards
Binghamton Senators players
Bridgeport Sound Tigers players
Charlotte Checkers (2010–) players
Iserlohn Roosters players
Omaha Lancers players
Ottawa Senators players
Penn State Nittany Lions men's ice hockey players
HC Slovan Bratislava players
South Carolina Stingrays players
Ice hockey people from Anchorage, Alaska
Toronto Maple Leafs players
Toronto Marlies players
Undrafted National Hockey League players
Växjö Lakers players
American expatriate ice hockey players in Slovakia
American expatriate ice hockey players in Sweden
American expatriate ice hockey players in Canada
Swedish expatriate ice hockey players in Germany